Presidential Film Awards is a film award ceremony held in Sri Lanka. It is organized by the National Film Corporation along with the Presidential Secretariat and the Ministry of Cultural Affairs. It was 1st awards in 1979 by President J. R. Jayewardene, and continue till 2004. The awards were not held from 2005 to 2014 when Mahinda Rajapakse was president. The award started to be presented again in 2015 by President Maithripala Sirisena.

President awarding J. R. Jayewardene

1979 Winners

Best Film:	Bambaru Avith - Thilak Godamanna
Best Direction:	Bambaru Avith - Dharmasena Pathiraja, Ahasin Polawata - Lester James Peries
Best Actor:	Ahasin Polawata - Tony Ranasinghe
Best Actress:	Bambaru Avith - Malini Fonseka
Best Script Writer:	Ahasin Polawata - Tissa Abeysekara
Best Cinematographer:	Ahasin Polawata - Donald Karunarathna
Best Editor:	Ahasin Polawata - Sumitra Peries
Best Music Director:	Bambaru Avith - Premasiri Kemadasa
Best Art Director:	Veera Puran Appu - Hemapala Dharmasena
Best Sound Director:	Veera Puran Appu - Mical Sathyanadan
Best Supporting Actor:	Veera Puran Appu - Tissa Abeysekara
Best Supporting Actress:	Sasara - Shanthi Lekha
Best Lyrics Writer:	Bambaru Avith - W. Jayasiri ("Udumbara Hinehenawa" - "Adaraye Oba Obamai")
Best Playback Singer Male:	Janaka Saha Manju - T. M. Jayaratne (" Ko Ma Pethu Obe Adare")
Best Playback Singer Female:	Ahasin Polawata - Rukmani Devi ("Doi Doi")
Merit Awards:	Bambaru Avith - Ruby de Mel, Bambaru Avith - Cyril Wickramage, Gehenu Lamai - Shyama Ananda, Gehenu Lamai - M. S. Ananda, Gehenu Lamai - Chitra Wakishta, Bambaru Avith - Dharmasena Pathiraja, Janaka Saha Manju - Upali Aththanayaka, Ahasin Polawata - Relex Ranasingha, Hitha Mithura - Sriyani Amarasena, Gehenu Lamai - Vasanthi Chathurani, Gehenu Lamai - Victor Rathnayake, Bambaru Avith - Sextas Aponsu, Bambaru Evith - Joe Abeywickrama

1980 Winners

Best Film:	Palagetiyo - Vasantha Obeysekera
Best Direction:	Palagetiyo - Vasantha Obeysekera
Best Actor:	Sarungale - Gamini Fonseka
Best Actress:	Wasanthaye Dawasak - Malini Fonseka
Best Script Writer:	Palagetiyo - Vasantha Obeysekera
Best Cinematographer:	Wasanthaye Dawasak - Sumiththa Amarasingha
Best Editor:	Podi Malli - Jayathissa Dillimuni
Best Music Director:	Wasanthaye Dawasak - Premasiri Kemadasa
Best Art Director:	Wasanthaye Dawasak - Hemapala Dharmasena
Best Sound Director:	Palagetiyo - Jorge Manathunge
Best Supporting Actor:	Wasanthaye Dawasak - Joe Abeywickrama
Best Supporting Actress:	Wasanthaye Dawasak - Somalatha Subasinghe
Best Lyrics Writer:	Wasanthaye Dawasak - "Dedunnen Ena" - Ajantha Ranasinghe
Best Playback Singer Male:	Wasanthaye Dawasak - "Mala Gira" - T. M. Jayaratne
Best Playback Singer Female:	Monarathenna - "Handa Haaun Hande" - Nanda Malini
Special Jury Award:	Handaya - Titus Thotawatte
Merit Awards:	Palagetiyo - Andrew Jayamanne (Cinematographer), Palagetiyo - Denawaka Hamine (Acting), Palagetiyo - Vijaya Kumaratunga (Acting), Palagetiyo - Dharmasiri Bandaranayake (Acting), Sarungale - Fareena Lai (Acting), Sarungale - Wimal Kumara de Costa (Acting), Sarungale - Sriyani Amarasena (Acting), Podi Malli - Ravindra Randeniya (Acting),

1981 Winners

Best Film:	Ganga Addara - Milina Sumathipala, Siribo Aiya - Ranjith Palansuriya / Jinadasa Palansuriya / Dharmpriya Palansuriya. 
Best Direction:	Ganga Addara - Sumitra Peries, Siribo Aiya - Sunil Ariyaratne
Best Actor:	Siribo Aiya - Joe Abeywickrama
Best Actress:	Ganga Addara - Vasanthi Chathurani
Best Script Writer:	Ganga Addara - Tissa Abeysekara
Best Cinematographer:	Ganga Addara - Donald Karunarathna (color), Hansa Vilak - Andrew Jayamanne (Black & White)
Best Editor:	Ganga Addara - Sumitra Peries
Best Music Director:	Siribo Aiya - Victor Rathnayake
Best Art Director:	Ganga Addara - Hemapala Dharmasena
Best Sound Director:	Hansa Vilak - Lionel Gunarathna
Best Makeup Artist:	Parithyaga - Ebert Wijesinghe
Best Supporting Actor:	Uthumaneni - Somy Rathnayake
Best Supporting Actress:	Raththaththin Raththame - Geetha Kumarasinghe
Best Lyrics Writer:	Ganga Addara - "Ganga Addara Ma" / "Ran Tikiri Sina" - Augustus Vinayagarathnam
Best Playback Singer Male:	Siribo Aiya - "Kavi" - W. D. Amaradeva
Best Playback Singer Female:	Siribo Aiya - "Kavi" - Nanda Malini
Merit Awards:	Karumakkarayo - Upali Athtanayaka, Hansa Vilak - Dharmasiri Bandaranayake, Hansa Vilak - Swarna Mallawarachchi, Siribo Aiya - Somasiri Denipitiya, Uthumaneni - Farina Lai, Miurige Kathawa - Veena Jayakody, Parithyaga - Amarasiri Kalansuriya, Ganga Addara - Tony Ranasinghe

1982 Winners

Best Film:	Beddegama - Wilfred Perera
Best Direction:	Soldadu Unnehe - Dharmasena Pathiraja
Best Actor:	Beddegama - Joe Abeywickrama
Best Actress:	Aradhana - Malini Fonseka
Best Script Writer:	Soldadu Unnehe - Dharmasena Pathiraja / W. Jayasiri
Best Cinematographer:	Aradhana - Sumiththa Amarasingha (Color), Soldadu Unnehe - Jayanath Gunawardana (Black & White)
Best Editor:	Beddegama - Gladvin Fernando
Best Music Director:	Soldadu Unnehe - Premasiri Khemadasa
Best Art Director:	Thawalama - Hemapala Dharmasena
Best Sound Director:	Sathara Pera Nimithi - K. Balasubramaniyam
Best Makeup Artist:	Beddegama - Ebert Wijesinghe
Best Supporting Actor:	Beddegama - Henry Jayasena
Best Supporting Actress:	Beddegama - Nadeeka Gunasekara
Best Lyrics Writer:	Banduru Mal - " Bawen Bawe Yana Gamane " - Pof. Sunil Ariyaratne
Best Playback Singer Male:	Sathara Pera Nimithi - "Buddan Saranan Gachchami" - T. M. Jayaratne
Best Playback Singer Female:	Sathara Pera Nimithi - "Gee Pothe Gee Thanu Visiri" - Nanda Malini
Swarna Singhe Awards:	Sir  Lester James Peries
Merit Awards:	Sathara Pera Nimithi - Pof. Sunil Ariyaratne (Lyrics), Beddegama - Willie Blake (Cinematographer), Sathara Diganthaya - Wimal Kumara de Costa (Acting), Bandura Mal - Veena Jayakody (Acting), Bandura Mal - Dharma Sri Munasinghe (Acting), Thawalama - Farina Lai (Acting), Beddegama - Tony Ranasinghe (Acting), Sathweni Dawasa - Ravindra Ranasinghe (Acting), Sagarayak Meda - Iranganie Serasinghe (Acting), Anjana - Freddie Silva (Acting)

1983 Winners

Best Film:	Maha Gedara - Chandrasiri Ganegoda
Best Direction:	Yahalu Yeheli - Sumitra Peries
Best Actor:	Malata Noena Bambaru - Joe Abeywickrama
Best Actress:	Re Manamali - Veena Jayakody
Best Script Writer:	Maha Gedara - Tissa Abeysekara
Best Cinematographer:	Yahalu Yeheli - Donald Karunarathna (Color), Malata Noena Bambaru - Donald Karunarathna (Black & white)
Best Editor:	Malata Noena Bambaru - Lal Piyasena
Best Music Director:	Yahalu Yeheli - Nimal Mendis
Best Art Director:	Yahalu Yeheli - Hemapala Thale
Best Sound Director:	Malata Noena Bambaru - Michael Sathyanadan
Best Makeup Artist:	Kele Mal - Derric Frenando
Best Supporting Actor:	Adishtana - J. H. Jayawardana
Best Supporting Actress:	Maha Gedara - Geetha Kumarasinghe
Best Lyrics Writer:	Redi Nimnaya - "Sulaga Waga Evidin" - Bandara K. Wijethunga
Best Playback Singer Male:	Adishtana - Sunil Edirisinghe
Best Playback Singer Female:	Yasa Isuru - "Ammawarune" - Nanda Malini
Merit Awards:	Maha Gedara - Tissa Abeysekara (Acting), Maha Gedara - Sriyani Amarasena (Acting), Maha Gedara - Dhamma Jagoda (Acting), Biththi Hathara - Neel Alas (Acting), Yahalu Yeheli - Nadeeka Gunasekara (Acting), Maha Gedara - Tissa Abeysekara (Acting), Ridee Nimnaya - Swarna Mallawarachchi (Acting), Ridee Nimnaya - Shanthi Lekha (Acting), Paramitha - Tony Ranasinghe (Acting), Paramitha - Ravindra Randeniya (Acting), Kele Mal - Wijeratne Warakagoda (Acting)

1984 Winners

Best Film Dadayama - Rabin Chandrasiri / Sunil Chandrasiri / P. A. Somapala
Best Direction	Dadayama - Vasantha Obeysekera
Best Actor	Dadayama - Ravindra Randeniya
Best Actress	Dadayama - Swarna Mallawarachchi
Best Script Writer	Dadayama - Vasantha Obeysekera / Christy Shelton Fernando / K. L. De Silva
Best Cinematographer	Dadayama - Donald Karunarathna (Color), Thunweni Yamaya - Andrew Jayamanna (Black & White)
Best Editor	Dadayama - Stanly de Alwis
Best Music Director	Muhudu Lihini - H. M. Jayawardena
Best Art Director	Kaliyugaya - Eral Keli
Best Sound Director	Dadayama - K. P. K Balasingham
Best Makeup Artist	Muhudu Lihini - Ranjith Mathakaweera
Best Supporting Actor	Dadayama - Somy Rathnayake
Best Supporting Actress	Kaliyugaya - Trilicia Gunawardena
Best Lyrics Writer	Muhudu Lihini - "Sithija Ime Sidu Gembure" - Ajantha Ranasinghe
Best Playback Singer Male	Muhudu Lihini - "Sithija Ime Sidu Gembure" - W. D. Amaradeva
Best Playback Singer Female	Siwuraga Sena - "Wessa Wete Midule" - Nanda Malini
Swarna Singhe Awards	K. A. W. Perera
Merit Awards	Muhudu Lihini - Aruna Shanthi (Acting), Muhudu Lihini - Anoja Weerasinghe (Acting), Muhudu Lihini - Robin Fernando (Acting), Muhudu Lihini - D. B. Nihalsinghe (Cinematographer-Color), Dadayama - Rathnawali Kekunawela (Acting), Dadayama - Iranganie Serasinghe (Acting), Thunweni Yamaya - Wasantha Kotuwella (Acting), Thunweni Yamaya - Indira Johanclass (Acting), Pasamithuro - Alexander Fernando (Acting), Pasamithuro - Mervyn Jayathunga (Acting), Kaliyugaya - Punya Heendeniya (Acting)

1985 Winners

Best Film: Arunata Pera - Ananda Gunasekara
Best Direction: Arunata Pera - Amaranath Jayathilaka
Best Actor: Arunata Pera - Wijeratne Warakagoda
Best Actress: Arunata Pera - Chandi Rasika
Best Script Writer: Arunata Pera - Amaranath Jayathilaka / Kumara Karunarathna
Best Cinematographer: Maya - Donald Karunarathna (Color), Arunata Pera - Duminda Weerasinghe (Black & White)
Best Editor: Arunata Pera - Elmo Halliday
Best Music Director: Arunata Pera - W. B. Makuloluwa
Best Art Director: HimaKathara - Eral Keli
Best Sound Director: HimaKathara - Shesha Palihakkara
Best Makeup Artist: Maya - K. P. K. Balasingham
Best Supporting Actor: HimaKathara - Sathischandra Edirisinghe
Best Supporting Actress: Sathi Pooja - Chandani Seneviratne
Best Lyrics Writer: HimaKathara - "Kanda Eha" - Augustus Vinayagarathnam
Best Playback Singer Male: HimaKathara - "Kanda Eha" - Ivor Dennis
Best Playback Singer Female: No Award
Merit Awards: Himakathara - Dharmasiri Wickramarathna (Directing), Himakathara - Iranganie Serasinghe (Acting), Arunata Pera - Denawaka Hamine (Acting), Adara Geethaya - Douglas Ranasinghe (Acting), Adara Geethaya - Sabeetha Perera (Acting), Hithawathiya - Anoja Weerasinghe (Acting), Sathi Pooja - Suvineetha Weerasinghe (Acting), Deweni Gamana - Gamini Wijesooriya (Acting), Parasathuro - Sarath Dassanayake (Music)

 President awarding - Chandrika Kumaratunga

2004 Winners

Best Film - Mille SoyaBest Director - Boodee Keerthisena (Mille Soya)
Best Actor - Jackson Anthony (Sooriya Arana)
Best Actress - Geetha Kumarasinghe (Randiya Dahara)
Best Playback Singer (Female)- Deepika Priyadarshani (Aadaraneeya Wassaanaya)
Best Playback Singer (Male)- Harshana Dissanayake (Sooriya Arana) 
Best Make-up Artist - Ebert Wijesinghe (Sooriya Arana)
Best Art Direction - Chandragupta Thenuwara (Mille Soya)
Best Sound Direction - Shyaman Premasundara (Sooriya Arana)
Best Supporting Actress - Grace Ariyawimal (Gini Kirilli) 
Best Supporting Actor - Mahendra Perera (Randiya Dahara) 
Best Editor - Ravindra Guruge (Mille Soya)
Best Camera Direction - Channa Deshapriya (Sooriya Arana)
Best Music Direction - Navaratne Gamage (Aadaraneeya Wassaanaya)
Best Script - Somaratne Dissanayake (Sooriya Arana) 
Best Composer- Somaratne Dissanayake (Sooriya Arana)
Best Upcoming Actor - Roshan Ravindra (Aadaraneeya Wassaanaya)
Best Upcoming Actress -Chathurika Peiris (Aadaraneeya Wassaanaya)
Best Popular Movie - Renuka Balasooriya (Sooriya Arana)
Pioneer Awards - Shelton Premaratne, G. D. L. Perera, Udula Dabare, Anula Karunathilaka 
Vishva Keerthi Awards - Bennett Rathnayake, Asoka Handagama, Nithyavani Kandasamy, Anoma Janadari, Inoka Sathyangani, Damitha Abeyratne, Prasanna Vithanage, Nimmi Harasgama
Swarne Singhe Awards - Tony Ranasinghe, D. B. Nihalsinghe, Iranganie Serasinghe, Premasiri Khemadasa 
Special Award: Vimukthi Jayasundara

 President awarding - Maithripala Sirisena

 2015 Winners

Best Film:	Mohomad Adom Ali (Oba Nathuwa Oba Ekka)
Best Direction:	Prasanna Vithanage (Oba Nethuwa Oba Ekka)
Best Actor:	Shyam Fernando (Oba Nethuwa Oba Ekka)
Best Actress:	Anjali Patail (Oba Nethuwa Oba Ekka)
Best Script Writer:	Prasanna Vithanage (Oba Nethuwa Oba Ekka)
Best Cinematographer:	Channa Deshapriya (Address Na)
Best Editor:	Sheker Prasad (Oba Nethuwa Oba Ekka)
Best Music Director:	Lakshman Joseph de Saram (Oba Nethuwa Oba Ekka)
Best Film Song:	Dinesh Subasinghe (Ho Gana Pokuna)
Best Art Director:	Manjula Ayagama (Ho Gana Pokuna)
Best Sound Director:	Thapas Nayak (Oba Nethuwa Oba Ekka)
Best Makeup Artist:	Harsha Manjula (Address Ne)
Best Supporting Actor:	Jayalath Manoratne (Ho Gana Pokuna)
Best Supporting Actress:	Damitha Abeyratne (Address Ne)
Best Lyrics Writer:	Pallegama Hemarathana Thero (Maharaja Gemunu)
Best Playback Singer Male:	Amila Perera (Sinahawa Atharin)
Best Playback Singer Female:	Nirosha Virajini (Sinahawa Atharin)
Special Jury Award:	Kaushalya Fernando
Swarna Singhe Awards:	Nanda Malini, Vasantha Obeysekera, Swarna Mallawarachchi, Donald Karunarathna, Dharmasiri Bandaranayake, Anoja Weerasinghe
Merit Awards:	Dinakshie Priyasad (Me Wage Adarayak), Senith Sathwiru Walpitagamage (Ho Gana Pokuna), Sathsara Sawan Jayasooriya (Ho Gana Pokuna), Senitha Dinith Gunasinhe (Ho Gana Pokuna), Nethpriya Madhubhashitha Ranawakarachchige (Ho Gana Pokuna), Thishakya Sankalana Kumarathunga (Ho Gana Pokuna'')
Pioneer Awards:	Tissa Liyanasooriya, Athor U. Amarasena, K. P. K Balasingham, Derrik Pranandu, A. D Ranjith Kumara, Prof. Sunil Ariyaratne, Chandra Kaluarachchi, Sunil Mihindukula, Gamini Weragama

2016 Winners

2017 Winners

2018 Winners

References

Sri Lankan film awards